Wilhelm Enßlin (9 December 1885 – 8 January 1965) was a German ancient historian.

Corresponding Fellows of the British Academy
1885 births
1965 deaths
Academic staff of the University of Graz
Members of the Bavarian Academy of Sciences
Historians of antiquity
German prisoners of war in World War I
Academic staff of the University of Marburg

References 

 Helmut Berve: Wilhelm Ensslin. In: Jahrbuch der Bayerischen Akademie der Wissenschaften 1966, S. 170–175 (online).
 Karl Christ: Klios Wandlungen. Die deutsche Althistorie vom Neuhumanismus bis zur Gegenwart. Beck, München 2006, S. 54.
 Karl Christ: Römische Geschichte und deutsche Geschichtswissenschaft. Beck, München 1982, S. 148–150.
 Hartmut Leppin: Ensslin, Wilhelm. In: Peter Kuhlmann, Helmuth Schneider (Hrsg.): Geschichte der Altertumswissenschaften. Biographisches Lexikon (= Der Neue Pauly. Supplemente. Band 6). Metzler, Stuttgart/Weimar 2012, Sp. 358–359.
 Adolf Lippold: Wilhelm Ensslin. In: Gnomon. Band 37, 1965, S. 637–639.
 Helmuth Schneider: „...über einen zähen Abwehrwillen hinaus zu einem abgründigen Haß“. Wilhelm Enßlin zu: Der Einfluß Karthagos auf Staatsverwaltung und Wirtschaft der Römer. In: Michael Sommer, Tassilo Schmitt (Hrsg.): Von Hannibal zu Hitler. „Rom und Karthago“ 1943 und die deutsche Altertumswissenschaft im Nationalsozialismus. wbg Academic, Darmstadt 2019, S. 198–229.